Suicide is the act of intentionally ending one's own life (and can be a noun for a person who has died by suicide).

Suicide may also refer to:

Arts, entertainment and media
 Suicide (wrestling), a professional wrestling persona, used by multiple professional wrestlers
 Suicide (game), a type of street game that involves the bouncing of a ball against a wall
 Suicide (Durkheim book), an 1897 case study on suicide by French sociologist Émile Durkheim
 Suicide (novel), a 2008 short novel by Edouard Levé
 Suicide (Suvorov book), a 2001 book by Viktor Suvorov

Music 
 Suicide (band), an American electronic/punk band, intermittently active from 1970-2016
 Suicide (1977 album), the first album by Suicide
 Suicide: Alan Vega and Martin Rev, the second album by Suicide
 Suicide (Sweet Water album), a 1999 album by American rock band Sweet Water
 Suicide, a 2010 mixtape by American rapper Lil Scrappy
 Suicide, it's a suicide, a hip hop meme
 "Suicide", a song by T-Pain from the 2007 album Epiphany
 "Suicide", a song by The Devin Townsend Band from the 2003 album Accelerated Evolution
 "Suicide", a song by Thin Lizzy from the 1975 album Fighting
 "Suicide", a song of by the band Adler's Appetite

Other uses 
 Animal suicide, suicide in animals concerns self-destructive behavior of various species in the animal kingdom
 Aokigahara (also called the Suicide Forest), in Japan
 Euthanasia, the practice of intentionally ending life to relieve pain and suffering
 Suicide, a trick with the diabolo juggling prop, in which the player lets go of one hand and spins the diabolo freely
 Suicide (b-boy move),  a breakdancer's sudden drop to his or her back
 Suicide Hill (Montana), a mountain in the U.S. state of Montana

See also 
 The Suicide (disambiguation)